The History of Hamas is an account of the  Palestinian Islamist fundamentalist socio-political organization with an associated paramilitary force, the Izz ad-Din al-Qassam Brigades. Hamas Ḥamās is an acronym of حركة المقاومة الاسلامية Ḥarakat al-Muqāwamat al-Islāmiyyah, meaning "Islamic Resistance Movement".

Hamas was established in 1987, and has its origins in Egypt's Muslim Brotherhood movement, which had been active in the Gaza Strip since the 1950s and gained influence through a network of mosques and various charitable and social organizations. In the 1980s the Brotherhood emerged as a powerful political factor, challenging the influence of the PLO, and in 1987 adopted a more nationalist and activist line under the name of Hamas. During the 1990s and early 2000s, the organization conducted numerous suicide bombings and other attacks against Israel.

In the Palestinian legislative election of January 2006, Hamas gained a large majority of seats in the Palestinian Parliament, defeating the ruling Fatah party. After the elections, conflicts arose between Hamas and Fatah, which they were unable to resolve. In June 2007, Hamas defeated Fatah in a series of violent clashes, and since that time Hamas has governed the Gaza portion of the Palestinian Territories, while at the same time they were ousted from government positions in the West Bank. Israel and Egypt then imposed an economic blockade on Gaza and largely sealed their borders with the territory.

After acquiring control of Gaza, Hamas-affiliated and other militias launched rocket attacks upon Israel, which Hamas ceased in June 2008 following an Egyptian-brokered ceasefire. The ceasefire broke down late in 2008, with each side accusing the other of responsibility. In late December 2008, Israel attacked Gaza, withdrawing its forces in mid-January 2009.

Early Islamic activism in Gaza 
With its takeover of Gaza after the 1967 war with Egypt, Israel hunted down secular Palestinian Liberation Organization factions, but dropped the previous Egyptian rulers' harsh restrictions against Islamic activists. In fact, Israel for many years tolerated and at times encouraged Islamic activists and groups as a counterweight to the secular nationalists of the PLO and its dominant faction, Fatah.

Among the activists benefited was Sheikh Ahmed Yassin, leader of the Muslim Brotherhood in Gaza, who had also formed the Islamist group Mujama al-Islamiya, a charity recognized by Israel in 1979. Israel allowed the organization to build mosques, clubs, schools, and a library in Gaza.

Yitzhak Segev, the acting governor of Gaza in 1979, said he had no illusions about Yassin's intentions, having watched an Islamist movement topple the Shah as Israel's military attache in Iran. However, according to Segev, Yassin and his charity were "100% peaceful" towards Israel during this time, and Segev and other Israeli officials feared being viewed as an enemy of Islam. Segev maintained regular contact with Yassin, met with him around a dozen times, and arranged for Yassin to be taken to Israel for hospital treatment.

Also, Segev said, Fatah was "our main enemy." Islamists frequently attacked secular and leftist Palestinian movements, including Fatah, but the Israeli military avoided getting involved in those quarrels. It stood aside, for example, when Mujama al-Islamiya activists stormed the Red Crescent charity's headquarters in Gaza, but Segev did send soldiers to prevent the burning down of the home of the head of the organization.

In 1984 the Israeli army received intelligence that Yassin's followers were collecting arms in Gaza. Israeli troops raided mosques and found a cache of weapons. Yassin was arrested, but told his interrogators the weapons were meant to be used against secular Palestinians, not Israel. The cleric was released a year later and allowed to continue to develop his movement in Gaza.

Around the time of Yassin's arrest, Avner Cohen, an Israeli religious affairs official, sent a report to senior military officers and civilian leadership in Gaza advising them of the dangers of the Islamic movement, but this report and similar ones were ignored. Former military intelligence officer Shalom Harari said the warnings were ignored out of neglect, not a desire to fortify the Islamists: "Israel never financed Hamas. Israel never armed Hamas."

1987 – The founding of Hamas 

In 1987, several Palestinians were killed in a traffic accident involving an Israeli driver, and the events that followed–a Palestinian uprising against Israel's West Bank and Gaza occupation–led Yassin and six other Palestinians to found Hamas as an offshoot of Egypt's Muslim Brotherhood. The new group was supported by Brotherhood-affiliated charities and social institutions that had already gained a strong foothold in the occupied territories. The acronym "Hamas" first appeared in 1987 in a leaflet that accused the Israeli intelligence services of undermining the moral fiber of Palestinian youth as part of Mossad's recruitment of what Hamas termed "collaborators." Nonetheless, Israeli military and intelligence was still focused on Fatah, and continued to maintain contacts with Gaza Islamic activists. Numerous Islamist leaders, including senior Hamas founder Mahmoud Zahar, met with Yitzhak Rabin as part of "regular consultations" between Israeli officials and Palestinians not linked to the PLO.

Hamas carried out its first attack against Israel in 1989, abducting and killing two soldiers. The Israel Defense Forces immediately arrested Yassin and sentenced him to life in prison, and deported 400 Hamas activists, including Zahar, to South Lebanon, which at the time was occupied by Israel. During this time Hamas built a relationship with Hezbollah.

From 1987 to 1991, Hamas campaigned for the wearing of the hijab alongside other measures, including insisting women stay at home be segregated from men, and the promotion of polygamy. In the course of this campaign women who chose not to wear the hijab were verbally and physically harassed, with the result that the hijab was being worn 'just to avoid problems on the streets'.

The 1990s 
Hamas's military branch, the Izz ad-Din al-Qassam Brigades, was created in 1991. Although the Brigades are an integral part of Hamas, they operate independently, and at times contrary to Hamas policy. During the 1990s the al-Qassam Brigades conducted numerous attacks against civilians and the Israeli military. From April 1993 these included suicide bombings, for which Hamas became well known internationally. A major motivation for Hamas's decision to use suicide attacks as its primary modus operandi was the February 1994 massacre by Baruch Goldstein of 30 Muslims in a Hebron mosque. The Brigades' Yahya Ayash who may have masterminded most of the early suicide attacks, was killed by the Israeli secret service in early 1996.

In December 1992 Israel responded to the killing of a border police officer by deporting 415 leading figures of Hamas and Islamic Jihad to Lebanon, which provoked international condemnation and a unanimous UN Security Council resolution, number 799, condemning the action and demanding the return of those deported. Those expelled had their identification papers confiscated and were bussed through the Israeli security zone in southern Lebanon, and released at the Zamraya crossing. Each deportee was given $50. On their arrival the Lebanese authorities refused to allow them any further into Lebanon and they set up camp on the mountainside at Marj al Zuhur. Amongst those deported were around 100 sheikhs, imams, muezzins, qadi and other religious figures. 170 had university degrees or equivalent diplomas. Israel admitted seventeen, including a sixteen year old, had been deported by mistake. On 9 September 1993, coinciding with the Oslo agreement, 181 of the remaining 396 deportees were returned to the Gaza Strip where the majority were immediately detained by the Israeli authorities. The remaining 197 deportees returned to the Occupied Territories on 4 December 1983, 29 were immediately taken in to custody and 18 did not return.

Although the suicide attacks by the al-Qassam Brigades and other groups violated the 1993 Oslo accords (which Hamas opposed), Palestinian Authority President Yasir Arafat was reluctant to pursue the attackers and may have had inadequate means to do so. Some analysts stated that the Palestinian Authority could stop the suicide and other attacks on civilians but refused to do so.

In September 1997, Israeli agents in Jordan attempted but failed to kill Hamas leader Khaled Mashaal. In a bid to release Mossad agents captured by the Jordanian authority after the failed assassination attempt, King Hussein secured a deal with Israel to swap Yassin with Mossad agents.  Two years later Hamas was banned in Jordan, reportedly in part at the request of the United States, Israel, and the Palestinian Authority. Jordan's King Abdullah feared the activities of Hamas and its Jordanian allies would jeopardize peace negotiations with Israel, and accused Hamas of engaging in illegitimate activities within Jordan. In mid-September 1999, authorities arrested Hamas leaders Khaled Mashaal and Ibrahim Ghosheh on their return from a visit to Iran, and charged them with being members of an illegal organization, storing weapons, conducting military exercises, and using Jordan as a training base. Hamas leaders denied the charges. Mashaal was exiled and eventually settled in Syria.

The Second Intifada 
This Palestinian uprising against Israeli rule in the occupied territories was much more violent than the First Intifada. The military and civilian death toll was estimated at 5,500 Palestinians, more than 1,100 Israelis, and 64 foreigners. A 2007 study of Palestinian suicide bombings during the Second Intifada (September 2000 through August 2005) found that about 40 percent were carried out by the al-Qassam Brigades.

The immediate trigger for the Second Intifada is disputed, but a more general cause, writes U.S. political science professor Jeremy Pressman, was "popular Palestinian discontent [that] grew during the Oslo peace process because the reality on the ground did not match the expectations created by the peace agreements." Hamas would be the beneficiary of this growing discontent in the 2006 Palestinian Authority legislative elections.

2004 – Negotiation Attempts 
In January 2004, Hamas leader Yassin said that the group would end armed resistance against Israel in exchange for a Palestinian state in the West Bank, including East Jerusalem, and the Gaza Strip, and that restoring Palestinians' "historical rights" (relating to the 1948 Palestinian exodus) "would be left for future generations." On January 25, 2004, senior Hamas official Abdel Aziz al-Rantissi offered a 10-year truce, or hudna, in return for the establishment of a Palestinian state and the complete withdrawal by Israel from the territories captured in the 1967 Six-Day War. Al-Rantissi stated that Hamas had come to the conclusion that it was "difficult to liberate all our land at this stage, so we accept a phased liberation." Israel immediately dismissed al-Rantissi's statements as insincere and a smokescreen for military preparations. Yassin was killed in a targeted killing on March 22, 2004, by an Israeli air strike, and al-Rantisi was killed by a similar air strike on April 18, 2004.

From the time of an attack on the Israeli southern town of Be'er Sheva in August 2004, in which 15 people were killed and 125 wounded, a truce was generally observed. Hamas violated it in August 2005, with an attack on the same bus station, wounding seven, and in several attacks on Israeli motorists—killing six.

At the end of January 2004, U.S. Secretary of State Colin Powell mandated Steve Cohen, a U.S. official, to meet with Hamas officials, according to the French newspaper Le Canard enchaîné. The mission was not only to inform the U.S. about the Hamas objectives, according to the newspaper, but also to evaluate if it could represent a counterbalance to al-Qaeda. In exchange for such cooperation, according to Le Canard, Hamas officials asked for the end of extrajudicial targeted killings carried out against them by the Israeli military.

While Hamas boycotted the 2005 Palestinian presidential election, it did participate in the 2005 municipal elections organized by Yasser Arafat in the occupied territories. In those elections it won control of over one third of Palestinian municipal councils, besting Fatah, which had traditionally been "the biggest force in Palestinian politics". With this electoral success behind it, Hamas contested the 2006 elections for the Palestinian Legislative Council as the main component of the List of Change and Reform.

2005 – Israel's unilateral disengagement plan 
In 2004, in a prelude to Israel's unilateral disengagement plan from the Gaza Strip, Israeli forces carried out a number of military attacks targeted at militants in Gaza cities and refugees camps, seeking to draw out and kill Hamas-affiliated gunmen. Awareness of high casualties during such incursions led the Hamas leadership to instruct its activists to avoid putting themselves needlessly in the line of fire. On September 12, 2005, IDF withdrew from the Gaza Strip and declared an official end to Israeli military rule in Gaza, though Israel still retained control of the airspace and of the sea. However, the Palestinian Authority argued that the occupation was on-going, as complete sovereignty includes control of both airspace and seaways. The Gaza Strip was called a "lawless open-air prison".

Hamas claimed that this unilateral withdrawal was a victory for its armed struggle and pledged to liberate all the occupied territories, including the West Bank and East Jerusalem. Fatah, on the other hand, viewed Ariel Sharon's unilateral plan as proof of the Palestinians' failure to obtain international recognition. Both criticized the disengagement plan, citing Sharon's simultaneous encouragement of Israeli settlements in the West Bank, including Ma'ale Adumim, a large settlement east of Jerusalem.

In April 2005, an advisor of Benjamin Netanyahu, principal right-wing opponent of Ariel Sharon, secretly negotiated with a Hamas representative, according to the Le Canard enchaîné. The meeting was about the "possibility of an administrative co-gestion with the Hamas in the occupied territories", which is already the case in some Hamas-controlled cities of the West Bank, according to the French newspaper, which continued: "But, in both sides, participants to such a dialogue keeps their mouth shut (bouche cousue). It is impossible to admit that one has met and negotiated with his sworn enemy."

January 2006 – Winning the legislative election 

While Hamas had boycotted the January 2005 presidential election, during which Mahmoud Abbas was elected to replace Yasser Arafat, it did participate in the municipal elections held between January and May 2005, in which it took control of Beit Lahia and Rafah in the Gaza Strip and  Qalqilyah in the West Bank. The January 2006 legislative elections marked another victory for Hamas, which gained the majority of seats, defeating the ruling Fatah party. The "List of Change and Reform", as Hamas presented itself, obtained 42.9% of the vote and 74 of the 132 seats.

Political decisions, and consequences on economy 

The result of the election was regarded as a major setback for governments attempting to mediate the ongoing Israeli-Palestinian conflict. The George W. Bush administration immediately declared that it would not deal with Hamas until it renounced its support of suicide bombings and violence, and accepted Israel's right to exist. Israeli president Moshe Katsav and Israel's ex–prime minister Shimon Peres both said that if Hamas would accept Israel's right to exist and give up violence, Israel should negotiate with the organization. President Vladimir Putin said that Russia would not support any efforts to cut off financial assistance to the Palestinians, stating that Hamas gained power by democratic means. He invited some Hamas leaders to Moscow beginning of March 2006, and in May, repeated that cutting funds to the Hamas was a "mistake".

The US and the EU cut all funds to the Palestinian Authority, with only Russia warning against the potential dangers of cutting out the PA from any Western support. The EU (which gives $500 million per year to the PA) announced that future aid to the Palestinians was tied to "Three Principles" outlined by the international community—Hamas must renounce violence, it must recognize Israel's right to exist, and it must express clear support for the Middle East peace process, as outlined in the 1993 Oslo Accords. Hamas did not seem to be ready to accept such conditions, and rejected them as "unfair". At best, they would be ready to accept the Arab Peace Initiative formulated on March 28, 2002, during the Arab League Beirut Summit: full normalization of relations with Israel in exchange for Israeli withdrawal to the 1967 internationally recognized borders, implying Israeli evacuation of the West Bank, the Gaza Strip, east Jerusalem, the Golan Heights and the return of all Palestinian refugees and their descendants. Furthermore, the US has imposed a financial blockade on the PA's banks, impeding some of the Arab League's funds (e.g. Saudi Arabia and Qatar) from being transferred to the PA.

Israel, on the other side, decided to cut transfers of the $55 million tax-receipts of the PA that it receives on the PA's behalf, since the PA did not have any access point to receive taxes. On February 19, 2006, interim Israeli Prime minister Ehud Olmert, who called the PA a "terrorist authority", decided to stop transfer of the $55 million tax-receipts to the PA, which accounts for a third of the PA's budget (two thirds of its proper budget) and insure the wages of 165,000 Palestinian civil servants (among them 60,000 security and police officers). Israel had already done that in 1991 and 1992, but international aid had covered up the budgetary losses. Israel also decided to increase controls on check-points, but finally decided against blocking Palestinians from commuting between Gaza and the West Bank and from prohibiting them to work in Israel. Criticizing these measures, moderate Labor leader Amir Peretz said that they were "indirect ways" to "get around Hamas and strengthen moderate forces" among the Palestinians.

In May 2006, following a World Bank report about the Palestinian economy, the Quartet on the Middle East (the United States, Russia, European Union, and the United Nations) agreed to transfer funds directly to the Palestinian population. Israeli minister of foreign affairs, Tzipi Livni, said the measure was "acceptable", while PA minister of foreign affairs, Mahmoud Zahar, welcomed the promise of aid but criticised attempts to bypass the PA: "We appreciate every effort in order to help the Palestinian people by legal channels... and the legal channel is the Palestinian Authority, whether the presidency or the government,".

The World Bank had already compared the 2001 and 2002 economic recession, due to the Second Intifada and Israel's refusal to transfer tax receipts, to the 1929 economic crisis. The UN underlined that unemployment, which was estimated to 23% in 2005, would increase to 39% in 2006, while poverty, estimated at 44%, would increase to 67% in 2006. According to a World Bank report published on May 7, 2006, the delay in paying the PA's civil servants—who had not received their wages since March 2006—was dangerous both on social and security plans. This convinced the United States to accept the EU proposal, supported by Russia and the Arab countries, of finding a way to transfer funds to the Palestinian society without passing by the Palestinian Authority. The Quartet on the Middle East thus accepted, on May 9, 2006, an "international temporary mechanism of limited range and length"

Last Fatah measures 
Before the Israeli decision to cut transfer of tax receipts, the Palestinian Assembly passed legislation giving the Palestinian President, Mahmoud Abbas, the power to appoint a court that could veto legislation passed by the new Hamas-led parliament to be sworn in start of February. The constitutional court would veto legislation deemed in violation of the Palestinians' Basic Law, a forerunner to the Palestinian constitution. Palestinian deputies also backed a decree that automatically makes members of the incoming parliament members of the Palestine Liberation Organization's (PLO) parliament in exile. Unlike the Hamas charter, the PLO charter recognises the legitimacy of Israel.

Hamas' declarations since the 2006 legislative elections 
Hamas has omitted its call for the destruction of Israel from its election manifesto, calling instead for "the establishment of an independent state whose capital is Jerusalem,".

On February 8, Hamas head Khaled Mashal speaking in Cairo clarified that "Anyone who thinks Hamas will change is wrong".

However, on February 13, 2006, in an interview in Russian newspaper Nezavisimaya Gazeta, the same Khaled Mashal declared that Hamas would stop armed struggle against Israel if it recognized the 1967 borders, withdrew itself from all Palestinian occupied territories (including the West Bank and East Jerusalem), and recognized Palestinian rights that would include the "right of return". This was the first time that Hamas even talked about an eventual stop to armed struggle. But Mashal continued to refuse to acknowledge the Road map for peace, adopted by the Quartet in June 2003, "since nobody respects it". The Road map projected the establishment of an independent Palestinian state in 2005. The Palestinian Authority's Al-Hayat Al-Jadeeda conducted a poll in 2006 that showed that 84% of Palestinians support a peace deal with Israel, based on the responses of "863 Palestinians from the Gaza Strip and West Bank," and that more than 75% of the peace-deal supporters voted for Hamas.

In April 2006, Henry Siegman, former director of the American Jewish Committee, stated that according to "a prominent senior member of Hamas's Political Committee" Hamas is prepared to explicitly recognize the state of Israel. "Members of Hamas's political directorate do not preclude significant changes over time in their policies toward Israel and in their founding charter, including recognition of Israel, and even mutual minor border adjustments. Such changes depend on Israel's recognition of Palestinian rights. Hamas will settle for nothing less than full reciprocity." These sentiments "are in striking contrast to the odiousness of Hamas's founding charter," said Siegman.

In May 2006, Hamas leaders threatened a new Intifada, as well as to decapitate anyone who tried to bring down their cabinet.

Cabinet formation 
Palestinian Prime Minister Ahmed Qurei and his cabinet resigned, leaving Hamas to form a new government, which was completely formed on March 20. On February 19, Hamas had chosen Ismail Haniya as Prime minister of the PA, and on the same day the government of Israel decided counter-measures against the new Hamas-led Palestinian Authority (suspension of $55 million transfer of tax-receipts). After the victory, Israeli human rights organizations  called on Hamas to stop its terror campaign against civilians and to eschew violence as a tool to achieve a political solution.

On March 20, 2006, Hamas unveiled its full cabinet list, placing loyal members in charge of all key ministries; of the 24 ministers appointed, the majority were Hamas (the others were independent or technocrats). Mahmoud Abbas' Fatah refused to join the Hamas government. The position of foreign minister was given to Mahmoud al-Zahar, a Gazan leader and target of previous targeted killing attempts by Israel. Saeed Seyam, another Hamas leader, was appointed interior minister, in charge of multiple security agencies. Hamas member and engineer Ala el-Deen Al-Araj was appointed economics minister. The position of finance minister was given to Omar Abdel-Razeq, Hamas election official and economics professor from the West Bank.

In his interview to The Sunday Telegraph, the newly appointed chief of the Palestinian security services Jamal Abu Samhadana stated: "We have only one enemy. They are Jews. We have no other enemy. I will continue to carry the rifle and pull the trigger whenever required to defend my people." However, president Mahmoud Abbas retained official control over the Palestinian security services.

Tensions between Fatah and Hamas 

After the formation of the Hamas cabinet on March 20, 2006, tensions progressively rose in the Gaza Strip between Fatah and Hamas militants. In May 2006, The Sunday Times reported that Israeli security sources claimed they had uncovered a Hamas plot to assassinate president Mahmoud Abbas. This was officially denied by a Hamas spokesman, while Mahmoud Abbas' spokesman, Nabil Abu Rudeina, described the report as "totally untrue".  On May 8, three Palestinians were killed and 10 wounded in clashes in southern Gaza, near Khan Yunis, between rival Hamas and Fatah gunmen. On May 6 and 7, hundreds of Palestinians demonstrated in Gaza and the West Bank demanding payment of their wages. Although this inter-Palestinian incident had been one of the most serious since January 2006, tension had been slowly risen with the "economic squeeze" on the PA.

Twelve people were killed during the first days of October 2006 in armed clashes between Fatah, and the Hamas Interior ministry police. These clashes started when the interior ministry militia forcibly dispersed a gathering of Policemen demonstrating against unpaid wages. The Fatah-affiliated Al-Aqsa brigades have threatened to kill Hamas leaders including Khaled Meshal, Saeed Seyam and Youssef al-Zahar. The Al-Asqa brigade kidnapped but then released a senior official in the Finance ministry.

Agreement and preservation of national unity 
On June 27, Hamas and Fatah reached an agreement on the prisoners' document, which included the forming of a national unity government.

In February 2007 Saudi-sponsored negotiations in Mecca produced agreement on a signed by Mahmoud Abbas on behalf of Fatah and Khaled Mashal on behalf of Hamas. The new government was called on to achieve Palestinian national goals as approved by the Palestine National Council, the clauses of the Basic Law and the National Reconciliation Document (the "Prisoners' Document") as well as the decisions of the Arab summit.

In March 2007, the Palestinian Legislative Council established a national unity government, with 83 representatives voting in favor and three against. Government ministers were sworn in by Mahmoud Abbas, the chairman on the Palestinian Authority, in at a ceremony held simultaneously in Gaza and Ramallah. In June that year, Hamas took control of the Gaza Strip from the national unity government after forcing out Fatah.

2006 Gaza–Israel conflict 

On June 9, during or shortly after an Israeli operation, an explosion occurred on a busy Gaza beach, killing eight Palestinian civilians.
It was initially assumed that Israeli shellings were responsible for the killings, although Israeli government officials later denied this.
Prompted by the recent events Hamas formally withdrew from its 16-month ceasefire on June 10, and took responsibility for the ongoing Qassam rocket attacks being launched from Gaza into Israel.

On June 24, Israeli operatives apprehended Osama and Mustafa Muamar in the Gaza Strip, alleged by Israel to be Hamas members. On June 25, a Hamas attack in Israel resulted in the deaths of two Israeli soldiers and the capture of Israeli Corporal Gilad Shalit. Israel then launched Operation Summer Rains on June 28 to recover the captured soldier. The ongoing operation initially consisted of heavy bombardment of bridges, roads, and the only power station in Gaza. Several PA facilities were also bombed, such as the Palestinian Interior Ministry and the office of the Palestinian Prime Minister Ismail Haniya.

On June 29, Israel captured 64 Hamas officials. Amongst them were eight Palestinian Authority cabinet ministers and up to twenty members of the Palestinian Legislative Council, as well as heads of regional councils, and the mayor of Qalqilyah and his deputy. At least a third of the Hamas cabinet was captured and held by Israel.
On August 6 Israeli forces detained the Hamas' Speaker of the Palestinian Legislative Council, Aziz Dweik, at his home in the West Bank.

In November 2006, a 64-year-old woman executed a suicide bombing mission, killing herself and slightly injuring 2 Israeli soldiers. Hamas claimed responsibility and its spokesman, Abu Obeida, declared that "both Palestinian men and women are committed to battling the Israelis".

2007 – End-of-truce with Israel 
On April 24, 2007, "six rockets were launched from Gaza [by Hamas], two of which landed in Israel". According to Bloomberg news, Palestinians said the rockets were in response to Israeli military action over the previous weekend which had "killed as many as eight people in the West Bank, where there is no cease-fire, and one in Gaza." Most of the dead were militants, but Palestinians said at least two civilians, including a 17-year-old girl, were killed. Hamas announced that it considered the truce to be over.

The rocket attack, which came on Israel's 59th Independence Day, caused no damage or injury. However, it marked the first time Hamas openly acknowledged firing shells toward Israel since agreeing to a cease-fire along the Gaza-Israel border in November.

Abu Ubeida, a spokesman for Hamas' armed wing, told foreign journalists that "there is no truce between us and the occupation, the occupation destroyed the truce from the moment it started, we did not trust the intentions of the occupation from the beginning." Abu Ubeida told the Voice of Palestine radio station that "the cease-fire has been over for a long time, and Israel is responsible for that." "This is a message to the Zionist enemy that our strikes will continue," Abu Obeida said of the rocket fire. "We are ready to kidnap more and more, and kill more and more of your soldiers."

Israeli soldier Cpl. Gilad Shalit's kidnappers demand the release of hundreds of Palestinian prisoners, including veterans and those involved in killing or wounding Israelis.

Israeli Prime Minister Ehud Olmert said on April 23, 2007, that freeing soldiers is important to the government, but that it would not repeat "mistakes made in the past" by releasing violent prisoners who then carried out more attacks against Israelis. But Olmert said there would be "no escape in the end from making a difficult decision" on trading prisoners for the captured Israeli troops.

Hamas militants stated on April 24, 2007, that they had launched 40 rockets and 70 mortar shells. The Israeli military said it could confirm six rockets and eight mortars. Two of the rockets fell in Israel, north of the Gaza Strip, the Israeli army said–they added that the attack was a diversion for an attempt by Hamas gunmen to kidnap an IDF soldier.

Hamas-Fatah conflict 

After the formation of the Hamas-led cabinet on March 20, 2006, tensions between Fatah and Hamas militants progressively rose in the Gaza strip, leading to demonstrations, violence, and repeated attempts at a truce. Israeli intelligence warned Mahmoud Abbas that Hamas had planned to kill him at his office in Gaza. According to a Palestinian source close to Abbas, Hamas considers president Abbas to be a barrier to its complete control over Palestine and decided to kill him. In a statement to Al Jazeera, Hamas leader Mohammed Nazzal, accused Abbas of being party to besieging and isolating the Hamas-led government.

On June 9, 2006, during an Israeli artillery operation, an explosion occurred on a busy Gaza beach, killing eight Palestinian civilians. It was assumed that Israeli shellings were responsible for the killings, but Israeli government officials denied this. Hamas formally withdrew from its 16-month ceasefire on June 10, taking responsibility for the subsequent Qassam rocket attacks launched from Gaza into Israel.

On June 29, following a joint incursion by Fatah, Islamic Jihad, and Hamas in which two Israeli soldiers were killed and corporal Gilad Shalit was captured, Israel captured 64 Hamas officials. Among them were 8 Palestinian Authority cabinet ministers and up to 20 members of the Palestinian Legislative Council, as well as heads of regional councils, and the mayor of Qalqilyah and his deputy. At least a third of the Hamas cabinet was captured and held by Israel. On August 6 Israeli forces detained the Speaker of the Palestinian Legislative Council, Hamas member Aziz Dweik, at his home in the West Bank.

These arrests, along with other events, including the subsequent arrest of the speaker of the Palestinian Legislative Council, effectively prevented the Hamas-dominated legislature that resulted from the preceding elections from functioning during most of its term.

In February 2007, Saudi-sponsored negotiations in Mecca produced agreement on a signed by Mahmoud Abbas on behalf of Fatah and Khaled Mashal on behalf of Hamas. The new government was called on to achieve Palestinian national goals as approved by the Palestine National Council, the clauses of the Basic Law and the National Reconciliation Document (the "Prisoners' Document") as well as the decisions of the Arab summit.

In March 2007, the Palestinian Legislative Council established a national unity government, with 83 representatives voting in favor and three against. Government ministers were sworn in by Mahmoud Abbas, the chairman on the Palestinian Authority, in at a ceremony held simultaneously in Gaza and Ramallah. In June that year, Hamas took control of the Gaza Strip from the national unity government after forcing out Fatah.

In June 2007, renewed fighting broke out between Hamas and Fatah. In the course of the June 2007 Battle of Gaza, Hamas exploited the near total collapse of Palestinian Authority forces in Gaza, to take over control of Gaza, ousting Fatah officials. President Mahmoud Abbas then dismissed the Hamas-led Palestinian Authority government. and outlawed the Hamas militia.

Immediately upon the conclusion of the Battle of Gaza, Israel imposed an economic blockade on Gaza, and Hamas repeatedly launched rocket attacks upon areas of Israel near its border with Gaza because of the blockade.

At least 600 Palestinians died in fighting between Hamas and Fatah. Human Rights Watch, a U.S.-based group, accused both sides in the conflict of torture and war crimes.

Gaza War 

On June 17, 2008, Egyptian mediators announced that an informal truce had been agreed to between Hamas and Israel. Hamas agreed to cease rocket attacks on Israel, while Israel agreed to allow limited commercial shipping across its border with Gaza, barring any breakdown of the tentative peace deal; Hamas also hinted that it would discuss the release of Gilad Shalit. Israeli sources state that Hamas also committed itself to enforce the ceasefire on the other Palestinian organizations.

While Hamas was careful to maintain the ceasefire, the lull was sporadically violated by other groups, sometimes in defiance of Hamas. For example, on June 24  Islamic Jihad launched rockets at the Israeli town of Sderot; Israel called the attack a grave violation of the informal truce, and closed its border crossings with Gaza.

On November 4, 2008, Israeli forces, stating they were attempting to stop construction of a tunnel, killed six Hamas gunmen in a raid inside the Gaza Strip. Hamas responded with increased rocket attacks, a total of 190 rockets in November according to Israel's military, up from two in each of the preceding months.

With the six-month truce officially expired on December 19, Hamas launched 50 to more than 70 rockets and mortars into Israel over the next three days, though no Israelis were injured. On December 21, Hamas said it was ready to stop the attacks and renew the truce if Israel stopped its "aggression" in Gaza and opened up its border crossings. The previous six weeks had seen a "dramatic increase" in attacks from Hamas.

On December 27 and 28, the Operation Cast Lead attack on Gaza was launched, killing over 280 and injuring 600 in its first two days, according to Palestinian officials. Most were Hamas police and security officers, though many civilians also died. According to Israel, militant training camps, rocket-manufacturing facilities and weapons warehouses that had been pre-identified were hit, and later they attacked rocket and mortar squads who fired around 180 rockets and mortars at Israeli communities. Chief of Gaza police force Tawfiq Jabber, head of the General Security Service Salah Abu Shrakh, senior religious authority and security officer Nizar Rayyan, and Interior Minister Said Seyam were among those killed during the fighting. Although Israel sent out thousands of cell-phone messages urging residents of Gaza to leave houses where weapons may be stored, in an attempt to minimise civilian casualties, some residents complained there was nowhere to go because many neighborhoods had received the same message. Israeli bombs landed close to civilian structures such as schools, and some alleged that Israel was deliberately targeting Palestinian civilians.

Israel declared a unilateral ceasefire on January 17, 2009. Hamas responded the following day by announcing a one-week ceasefire to give Israel time to withdraw its forces from the Gaza Strip. Between 1,166 and 1,400 Palestinians and 13 Israelis were killed in the conflict.

After the Gaza War 
On August 16, 2009, Hamas leader Khaled Mashaal stated that the organization is ready to open dialogue with the Obama administration because its policies are much better than those of former US president George W. Bush: "As long as there's a new language, we welcome it, but we want to see not only a change of language, but also a change of policies on the ground. We have said that we are prepared to cooperate with the US or any other international party that would enable the Palestinians to get rid of occupation." Despite this, an August 30, 2009, speech during a visit to Jordan in which Mashaal expressed support for the Palestinian right of return was interpreted by David Pollock of the Washington Institute for Near East Policy as a sign that "Hamas has now clearly opted out of diplomacy." However, in a rare and widely cited video interview with Charlie Rose on May 28, 2010, Mashaal expressed his view that a right of return (to a Palestinian state outside Israel's 1967 boundaries) was consistent with diplomacy toward a two-state solution, saying that "if Israel withdraws to the borders of 1967, it doesn't mean that it gives us back all the land of the Palestinians. But we do consider this as an acceptable solution to have a Palestinian state on the borders of 1967. Hamas accepts a Palestinian state on the borders of 1967 with its capital Jerusalem and with the right of return. This stand by Hamas is announced, practiced, and it signed an agreement with Fatah, which is the national compact document."

The August 2, 2010 rocket attack on Eilat and Aqaba sparked rage in Egypt at Hamas and Iran. The Egyptian press stated that the firing of the rockets from Egyptian territory by Hamas or by organizations cooperating with it constituted the crossing of a red line. The Egyptian position was that Iran is using Hamas as a local proxy to escalate violence in the Middle East and to sabotage the Palestinian reconciliation efforts, as well as efforts to renew Palestinian-Israeli peace negotiations.

In February 2010, Palestinian Authority security forces in the West Bank arrested a Hamas cell preparing to test-fire a Qassam rocket near Ramallah and handed the rocket over to Israel. Hamas later stated that "Having a Qassam rocket in the West Bank is a demand that must be achieved".

On June 20, 2010, senior Hamas official Mahmoud a-Zahar called on Palestinian residents of the West Bank to fire rockets into Israel.

Islamization of the Gaza Strip (2007–present) 

Since Hamas took control of the Gaza Strip in 2007, some of its members have attempted to impose Islamic dress or the Hijab head covering on women. Also, the government's "Islamic Endowment Ministry" has deployed Virtue Committee members to warn citizens of the dangers of immodest dress, card playing and dating. However, there are no government laws imposing dress and other moral standards, and the Hamas education ministry reversed one effort to impose Islamic dress on students. There has also been successful resistance to attempts by local Hamas officials to impose Islamic dress on women.

According to Human Rights Watch, the Hamas-controlled government of Gaza stepped up its efforts to "Islamize" Gaza in 2010, efforts that included, according to the organization, the "repression of civil society" and "severe violations of personal freedom."

Palestinian researcher Dr. Khaled Al-Hroub has criticized what he called the "Taliban-like steps" Hamas has taken. He wrote, "The Islamization that has been forced upon the Gaza Strip–the suppression of social, cultural, and press freedoms that do not suit Hamas's view[s]–is an egregious deed that must be opposed. It is the reenactment, under a religious guise, of the experience of [other] totalitarian regimes and dictatorships.

Hamas officials denied having any plans to impose Islamic law, one legislator stating that "What you are seeing are incidents, not policy," and that Islamic law is the desired standard "but we believe in persuasion." The Hamas education ministry reversed one effort to impose Islamic dress on students.

2011 
In 2011, Ismail Haniyeh, head of the Hamas administration in the Gaza Strip, condemned the killing of Osama bin Laden by American forces, praising bin Laden as a "martyr" and an "Arab holy warrior".

2017 
In December 2017, Hamas' leader stated that U.S. President Donald Trump's decision to recognize Jerusalem as Israel's capital was a "Declaration of War" and called for an uprising against the Jewish State.

Brief timeline 
 1984 Arrest of Sheikh Ahmed Yassin, sentenced to 12 years of prison after the discovery of an arms cache. Yassin is freed the next year.
 1987 Creation of Hamas by Sheikh Ahmed Yassin.
 1987–1993 First Intifada.
 1988 Hamas Covenant.
 1989 Israel outlaws Hamas and imprisons Sheikh Ahmed Yassin.
 1991 Gulf War.
 1992 Creation of the military branch Izz ad-Din al-Qassam.
 1993 Oslo Accords.
 April 1993. First Hamas suicide bombing at Mehola Junction.
 1996 Palestinian legislative and presidential election. Hamas boycotts them, allowing Fatah, led by Yasser Arafat, a large victory.
 January 5, 1996. Targeted killing of Yahya Ayyash, Hamas bomb maker.
 February–March 1996. 47 Israelis killed in three different bombings.
 October 1997. Freed by Prime Minister Benjamin Netanyahu for "humanitarian reasons" (actually, due to the botched killing attempt on Khaled Mashal, on September 25, 1997, by the Mossad in Jordan, a deal was brokered by Bill Clinton between Israel and Jordan) Sheikh Yassin is acclaimed as a hero on his return to Gaza.
 March 1998 – Death of Mohiyedine Sharif, master bombmaker
 September 2000. Beginning of Al-Aqsa Intifada.
 July 2002. Killing of Salah Shahade, leader of the Ezzedeen-al-qassam brigades.
 March 8, 2003, Israel kills Ibrahim al-Makadmeh, a leader of the Hamas's military wing. 3 other men are also killed
 January 6, 2004. 10-year truce (hudna) offered by senior Hamas official Abdel Aziz al-Rantissi in exchange of Israel's complete withdrawal to the 1967 borders.
 March 22, 2004, killing of Sheikh Yassin. Yassin, then an old man restricted to a wheel-chair due to his lifelong paralysis was killed in an Israeli missile strike. Abdel Aziz al-Rantissi replaced him as the leader of Hamas. On March 28, Rantissi stated in a speech given at The Islamic University in Gaza that "America declared war against God. Sharon declared war against God, and God declared war against America, Bush and Sharon".
 April 17, 2004, killing of Abdel Aziz al-Rantissi. Rantissi was also killed in an air strike by the Israeli Air Force, five hours after a fatal suicide bombing by Hamas. Khaled Mashal, the leader of Hamas in Syria, said Hamas should not disclose the name of its next leader in Gaza.
 April 18, 2004, Hamas secretly selected a new leader in the Gaza Strip, fearing he would be killed if his identity were made public. However, it was speculated that the new leader is Mahmoud al-Zahar; the second-in-command, Ismail Haniya; and third-in-command, Said Seyam.
 September 2004. Israeli army Chief of Staff Moshe Ya'alon said that Israel would "deal with [...] those who support terrorism", including those in "terror command posts in Damascus".
 September 26, 2004. Killing of Izz El-Deen Sheikh Khalil. Sheikh Khalil was killed by a car bomb in Damascus, Syria. Khalil was described variously as "mid-level", "senior", a "distinguished member", and believed to be in charge of the group's military wing outside the Palestinian territories. Although the Israeli government offered no official confirmation, anonymous Israeli officials acknowledged responsibility for the attack. In a statement released in Gaza, Hamas threatened to target Israelis abroad in retaliation.
 October 2004. Killing of Adnan al-Ghoul, assistant of Mohammed Deif, the leader of the Izz ad-Din al-Qassam brigades.
 November 11, 2004. Death of Yasser Arafat, chairman of the Palestine Liberation Organization (PLO) and president of the Palestinian National Authority.
 January 2005 Palestinian presidential election. Hamas boycotts them. PLO chairman Mahmoud Abbas elected to replace Yasser Arafat.
 Palestinian municipal elections, January–May 2005. Relative success of Hamas, which took control of Beit Lahia in northern Gaza, Qalqilyah in the West Bank and Rafah.
 March 2005. Hamas proclaims tahdiyah, a period of calm.
 January 25, 2006. Victory of the Hamas at the legislative election, which took 74 seats of the 132 seats.
 March 2007, the Palestinian Legislative Council established a national unity government headed by Ismail Haniya.
 June 2007. Hamas begins a takeover of Gaza, ending the coalition with Fatah.

See also 
 Hamas
 Israeli–Palestinian conflict

References 

Hamas

History of Palestine (region)
History of militant organizations